Min Khamaung (Arakanese:မင်းခမောင်း; , Arakanese pronunciation: ; also known as Hussein Shah; was a king of Arakan from 1612 to 1622.

Early Life 

The future king was born to Princess Pyinsala Sanda (ပဥ္စလစန္ဒာ) and Prince Razagyi in Khamaungseit (ခမောင်းဆိပ်) which is modern day Maungdaw Township on the year 1577.

Death 
The King was assassinated by one of his queen.

Reign 
Min Khamaung succeeded his father after revolted three times against his father, Min Razagyi death in 1612 . The Kingdom had been chaotic due to the Portuguese insurrections.

References

Bibliography
 
 
 
 

Monarchs of Mrauk-U
17th century in Burma
17th-century Burmese monarchs